Sir John Smith Flett   (26 June 1869 – 26 January 1947) was a Scottish physician and geologist.

Early life
Born in Kirkwall, Orkney, the son of James Ferguson Flett, a merchant and baillie, and Mary Ann (née Copland).  He was educated at Kirkwall Burgh School, George Watson's College in Edinburgh, and the University of Edinburgh (MA; BSc 1892; MB CM 1894; DSc 1900; LLD 1912).

Flett worked as a general practitioner for a short while after graduation, but in 1895 turned to geology for a career. He served as lecturer in Petrology at the University of Edinburgh, and as Petrographer (1901), Assistant Director (1911) and Director (1920–3) of the Geological Survey of Great Britain.

Expeditions

Flett participated in several geological expeditions. He went with Tempest Anderson to observe the aftermaths of eruptions in the Caribbean in 1902 and 1907.

Awards and later life
Flett was awarded the Neill Prize (1898–1901) of the Royal Society of Edinburgh and was elected a Fellow of the Royal Society of Edinburgh in 1900, on the proposal of James Geikie, Ben Peach, John Horne and Ramsay Traquair. He was elected a Fellow of the Royal Society in 1913, received the Bolitho Medal of the Royal Geological Society of Cornwall in 1917, made KBE in 1925 and won the Wollaston Medal in 1935.

Flett served as president of the Edinburgh Geological Society, president of the Mineralogical Society, and president of the geology section of the British Association (1921).

Flett died in Ashdon, Essex. Some of Flett's papers, relating to his time as student, are held at Edinburgh University., while the British Geological Survey holds an archive of his papers and correspondence from 1902-1944.

Family
Flett married Mary Jane 'Polly' Meason; They had four children: Winifred Mary Flett (1899-1991), Enid Jean Flett (1903 - 1972), Harald Flett (5 Feb 1906 - 1981) and Sir Martin Teall Flett (30 July 1911 - 25 Feb 1982). 

His granddaughter, the journalist Scarth Flett, was married to the Australian journalist, writer, scholar, and documentary filmmaker John Pilger.

Recognition

In the mid 1970s, the then new, glass-faced structure built in the grounds of the South Kensington Museums complex between the Geological Museum and the British Museum (Natural History) containing a lecture theatre, was named in his honour.

References

1869 births
1947 deaths
19th-century Scottish medical doctors
19th-century British geologists
People from Kirkwall
People educated at George Watson's College
Alumni of the University of Edinburgh
Academics of the University of Edinburgh
Fellows of the Royal Society of Edinburgh
Fellows of the Royal Society
Fellows of the Geological Society of London
Knights Commander of the Order of the British Empire
Scottish geologists
Scottish knights
Scottish mineralogists
Wollaston Medal winners
20th-century British geologists
20th-century Scottish medical doctors